Lieutenant Colonel John Montgomery (c. 1750–1794) was an American soldier, settler and explorer. He is credited with founding the city of Clarksville, Tennessee. Montgomery County, Tennessee is named after him.

Life
In 1771, Montgomery first entered the area of the Cumberland River. Much was learned in the expedition, but Native Americans forced the explorers back to Virginia.

In 1775, Montgomery was one of the signers of the Fincastle Resolutions, the earliest statement of armed resistance to the British Crown in the American Colonies.  During the American Revolutionary War, Montgomery served initially as a captain and finally as a lieutenant colonel under the command of Brigadier General George Rogers Clark during his Illinois campaign. Under Clark's orders, Montgomery led an expedition against several Indian tribes to prevent the British from organizing them to attack Kentucky. For the remainder of war, he ran supplies between New Orleans and Clark's army in the north.

Montgomery explored the area of the county that bears his name in 1775 while on a hunting expedition with Kasper Mansker. In 1784, Montgomery purchased the land at the confluence of the Cumberland and Red Rivers from North Carolina for 100 British pounds. He then founded Clarksville. In 1789 he and surveyor Martin Armstrong persuaded lawmakers to establish Clarksville as a tobacco inspection point. Montgomery became the first sheriff of the district.

In 1780 he signed the Cumberland Compact and in 1793 commanded territorial troops in the Nickajack Expedition against the Creek tribe.

Montgomery was killed near Eddy Creek, Kentucky on November 27, 1794, by an Indian ambush while hunting.

His statue stands near Clarksville's Public Square.

Family
His family was of Scottish descent and settled in the Colony of Virginia during the 17th century.

References

Further reading
 Goodpasture, Albert V. (1919) Colonel John Montgomery, Tennessee Historical Magazine V(3):145-150. Republished online by Bill Thayer, 2013.
 Williams, Eleanor. Montgomery County, Tennessee Encyclopedia of History and Culture

External links
 John Montgomery Statue, Waymarking.com
 The Illinois Regiment, Abstract to the George Rogers Clark Papers, Microfilm Roll #9, The Illinois Regiment
 Genealogy of John Montgomery by Diana Gale Matthiesen, et al.

1750 births
1794 deaths
Virginia militiamen in the American Revolution
Signers of the Fincastle Resolutions
People of pre-statehood Tennessee